Jijabad (also Romanized as Jījābād) is a village in Darbqazi Rural District, in the Central District of Nishapur County, Razavi Khorasan Province, Iran. At the 2006 census, its population was 98, in 32 families.

References 

Populated places in Nishapur County